Naked Elvis was a late-night British television quiz show on Channel 4 from 10 August to 3 December 1999 hosted by Tania Strecker. Two teams of students would answer general knowledge questions. There was a scoremaster dressed as Elvis Presley played by Marc Fossey, Sam Cullingworth and two others who would remove one item of clothing between each round until he was naked.

References

External links 
 
 

1999 British television series debuts
1999 British television series endings
1990s British game shows
Channel 4 original programming
English-language television shows
Television series by Banijay